Fairlight is a digital audio company based in Sydney. In 1979 they created the Fairlight CMI, one of the earliest digital audio workstation (DAW) with digital audio sampler, quickly used by artists such as Peter Gabriel, Kate Bush, and Jean Michel Jarre. They have since become a manufacturer of media tools such as digital audio recording and mixing consoles. Fairlight became such a prominent part of 1980s pop music that Phil Collins included the text "there is no Fairlight on this record" in the liner notes of No Jacket Required.

History
In 1975, Fairlight Instruments Pty Ltd was established by Peter Vogel and Kim Ryrie. They produced microprocessor-based music workstations with samplers, which were revolutionary for their time.

New sounds could be created by drawing a 'sound wave' on the screen, which the computer would produce as sound. Theoretically, any sound was possible. Apart from opening up a world of new sounds, the Fairlight gave composers and performers instant playback. By changing the wave patterns presented on a screen they could tweak a sound into shape without singing or performing it all over again.

The versatility of the early Fairlight was not lost on recording artists. The first record made entirely on a computer in the United States was done by EBN-OZN (Ned Liben, who represented Fairlight in New York, and Robert Ozn) – "AEIOU Sometimes Y" made in 1981, released in 1983.

Their hybrid analogue/digital Computer Video Instrument, invented by Kia Silverbrook, debuted in 1984. The fact that the CVI was also a "computer" was transparent to its use: it did not use a conventional ASCII keyboard (though in later models one could be attached), but rather a set of sliders and a small graphics pad about the size of the palm of a hand. Menu selections were made with a stylus rather than a mouse. The CVI allowed you to paint directly over the top of video footage as well as "with" video footage via an extensive series of effects.

In April 1989, Fairlight ESP (Electric Sound and Picture) was established by Kim Ryrie, with the financial backing of Australian distributor Amber.

In September 2016, Fairlight was acquired by Blackmagic Design.

Products
 CMI Music sampler (mid 1970s)
 MFX digital audio workstation with dedicated audio control surface (at least 3 versions) (MFX3 released 1997)
 Dream Constellation digital audio workstation with integrated audio control surface and mixing console (2004)
 Crystal Core processing engine – a sound processing device capable of sampling frequencies up to 384 kHz. Crystal core does not use DSP-based architecture, but a Field Programmable Gate Array. (CC-1 see Dream software below, CC-2 released 2014)
 Dream II software (ran with Crystal Core engine) (released 2008)
 Xynergi – a tactile control unit that makes use of self-labeling LCD keys. (2008)
 Quantum digital audio workstation, audio control surface and mixing console (2012)
 Quantum Live sound mixing console (2014)

Peter Vogel Instruments
In August 2009, a new company called Fairlight Instruments was launched by Peter Vogel, to produce a new range of computer musical instruments (CMI) based on Fairlight.au's "Crystal Core" media engine.

In July 2012, the company Fairlight Instruments changed its name to ' Peter Vogel Instruments. Peter Vogel announced the company was developing a completely new keyboard synthesizer which would be launched at Winter NAMM 2013. The name change was the result of a disagreement between the owners of the Fairlight Instruments trademark and himself that resulted in Fairlight revoking his license to use the name. According to them, the use of the Fairlight name only extended to the new version of the CMI, called the CMI-30A in reference to the instrument's 30th anniversary. Additionally, it extended to several other CMI hardware products planned, including a PC-based "Series IV." They claimed that because Vogel had also used the Fairlight name for the iOS CMI app as well, he had violated the terms of the agreement, and they were within their rights to terminate the agreement. Vogel said that he believed that the licensing agreement also extended to the app as well, but the Federal Court held the agreement had been validly terminated.

Vogel appealed to a full court of the Federal Court however the appeal was only partially successful, and Fairlight was required to pay 50% of Vogel's costs for the appeal.

The iOS app was temporarily withdrawn from the App Store but subsequently returned. The CMI-30A, however, has remained out of production, and visitors to the Vogel Instruments website are greeted with a notification that sales of the CMI-30A have been suspended pending the resolution of litigation with Fairlight.

References

External links
 
 Company making the Fairlight CMI 30th Anniversary edition 
 FairlightUS North America
 Fairlight Europe
 Candor Chasma – The main French resource about the Fairlight CMI (English version available)
 Image of Xynergi based studio
 Some of Peter Vogel's historical Fairlight images and music collection.
 http://www.fairlightau.com/Archive_Site/2006au2.html
 http://www.vintagesynth.com/
 Technical and historical Infos: CMI hardware + software (site by K.M.I.)

1975 establishments in Australia
2016 disestablishments in Australia
Audio mixing console manufacturers
Australian brands
Electronics companies disestablished in 2016
Electronics companies established in 1975
Audio equipment manufacturers of Australia
Manufacturers of professional audio equipment
Manufacturing companies based in Sydney
Musical instrument manufacturing companies of Australia
Synthesizer manufacturing companies of Australia

fr:Fairlight